The Nine-turn bridge or Zigzag bridge is one of the features of Chinese Gardens, where the bridge is designed to turn several times, so one can enjoy viewing different scenes. The bridge is usually made of stones or concrete with decorated guard rails, and the angles of the turns can be at right angles, at any other angle or curved.

The Nine-turn bridge is typically found in Chinese Gardens that were made during the Song Dynasty.

Gardens where the Nine-turn bridges are found 

The nine-turn bridge is found in many Chinese Gardens worldwide, or lakes and ponds, natural or man-made.
Yu Garden, Shanghai, China
West Lake, Hangzhou - Quyuanfenghe (曲院風荷) 
Geyuan Garden, Hangzhou
Classical Gardens of Suzhou: Lingering Garden, Lion Grove Garden, Humble Administrator's Garden, etc.
Huizhou West Lake (惠州西湖), Huizhou
Lou Lim Ieoc Garden, Macao
Chengcing Lake, Kaohsiung, Taiwan
Lotus Pond, Kaohsiung, Taiwan.
Dahu Park, Taipei
Bihu Park, Taipei
Honmoku Municipal Park (本牧市民公園), Yokohama, Japan - Shanghai-Yokohama Friendship Garden
Gifu Park, Gifu City - Sino-Japanese Friendship Park
National Arboretum, Washington, D.C., U.S. - Chinese Garden (under construction): a replica of Geyuan Garden 
Luisenpark, Mannheim, Germany - Chinese Garden

Gallery

Zigzag bridge in Japanese Garden

Zigzag bridges are sometimes found in Japanese Gardens, but they are usually a simple wooden bridge without guard rails.

See also 
Architecture of the Chinese Garden
Japanese Garden

References

Bridges by structural type